Ksenia Dzhalaganiya (born 7 July 1985) is a Russian group rhythmic gymnast, who is now the founder and director of Dubai Youth Olympic school of rhythmic gymnastics in the United Arab Emirates.

She is a World champion in group exercises (2002), a European champion in group exercises (1999), Honoured Master of Sports in rhythmic gymnastics, and winner of several international championships and Grand Prix events.

Personal life 
Ksenia Dzhalaganiya was born to Tatiana and Nikolay Dzhalaganiya in Moscow. In 2004, she graduated from the Aspect College in London and in 2008 she graduated from the Russian State University of Physical Culture, Sport, Youth and Tourism.

In September 2015 Ksenia married her fiancé, the Group Chief Executive Officer (CEO) of Cockett Marine Oil - Cem Saral. They met in Singapore in 2010 where Ksenia was coaching a junior national team of rhythmic gymnastics and three years later both moved to Dubai.

Gymnastics career 
Dzhalaganiya started rhythmic gymnastics at the age of five. In 1993, she won her first gold medal t the Grand Prix in Germany.

In 1997, Dzhalaganiya began training with A.N. Janina and Oxana Skaldina. In 1998, she became a member of the Russian Junior team of rhythmic gymnastics. In 1999 she won the European Junior Gymnastics Championships in Budapest. In the same year Dzhalaganiya received the title Master of sports of international class (MSIC) and the title of an Absolute Champion of Europe in the group exercises.

Dzhalaganiya was a member of the Russian Olympic team in rhythmic gymnastics from 2000 to 2003. In 2002 as a member of the Russian team in the group exercises she won gold medals and became an absolute World Champion. After returning to Russia, Dzhalaganiya took part in a press conference devoted to the championship (along with the other winners). In the same year Dzhalaganiya was awarded the title of Honoured Master of Sports of Russia and completed her secondary education at the Moscow School of Olympic Reserve.

In 2003 Dzhalaganiya ended her sports career and moved on to coaching. In 2010, she became a coach of Singapore Junior national team of rhythmic gymnastics. While preparing young gymnasts for the Youth Olympic Games in 2014. Dzhalaganiya accompanied her team to many International competitions.

Coaching career 
After retiring from professional sport, Dzhalaganiya continued her gymnastics career as a coach. In 2010, she signed a contract with Singapore Gymnastics Federation and led a Singapore junior national team of rhythmic gymnastics.

In 2015 Dzhalaganiya opened Dubai Youth Olympic school of rhythmic gymnastics.

External links
 Official website
 
 Ksenia Dzhalaganiya on Telegram
 Video of Ksenia Dzhalaganiya at the World Cup 2002

References

Living people
Russian rhythmic gymnasts
Russian gymnastics coaches
1985 births
Medalists at the Rhythmic Gymnastics World Championships
Gymnasts from Moscow